Brachygobius kabiliensis, commonly known as the kabili bumblebee goby, is a species of goby.

Habitat 

Inhabits both fresh and brackish water, and is generally restricted to lowland, coastal environments, including mangrove swamps, estuaries, and tidal streams.

Distribution 

The species has a Southeast Asia distribution, is native to Cambodia, Indonesia (Kalimantan), Malaysia (Peninsular Malaysia, Sabah, Sarawak), Singapore, Thailand and Vietnam.

References 

Fish of Thailand
kabiliensis
Fish described in 1958